Anthribus is a genus of fungus weevils in the family Anthribidae.

Species
Species include the following:
 Anthribus fasciatus Forster, 1770
 Anthribus nebulosus Forster, 1770
 Anthribus scapularis (Gebler, 1833)
 Anthribus subroseus Reitter, 1916

References

Further reading

 Alonso-Zarazaga, Miguel A., and Christopher H. C. Lyal (1999). A World Catalogue of Families and Genera of Curculionoidea (Insecta: Coleoptera) (Excepting Scotylidae and Platypodidae), 315.
 Valentine, Barry D. (1998). "A review of Nearctic and some related Anthribidae (Coleoptera)". Insecta Mundi, vol. 12, no. 3 and 4, 251–296.
 Valentine, Barry D. / Arnett, Ross H. Jr., Michael C. Thomas, P. E. Skelley, and J. H. Frank, eds. (2002). "Family 126. Anthribidae". American Beetles, vol. 2: Polyphaga: Scarabaeoidea through Curculionoidea, 695–700.
 Arnett, R. H. Jr., M. C. Thomas, P. E. Skelley and J. H. Frank. (eds.). (21 June 2002). American Beetles, Volume II: Polyphaga: Scarabaeoidea through Curculionoidea. CRC Press LLC, Boca Raton, Florida .
 
 Richard E. White. (1983). Peterson Field Guides: Beetles. Houghton Mifflin Company.

Anthribidae
Weevil genera
Taxa named by Étienne Louis Geoffroy